Marin Catholic High School (familiarly known as MC) is a Roman Catholic college preparatory school located in unincorporated Kentfield in Marin County, California. The school is owned by the Roman Catholic Archdiocese of San Francisco. It was founded in 1949. Annual tuition is $22,200.

Academics
Marin Catholic offers 12 Honors Classes and 16 Advanced Placement classes.

Notable alumni
 
Dave Anthony, entertainer
John Boccabella, Major League Baseball (MLB) player
Dan Fouts, Hall of Fame NFL quarterback.
Jared Goff, NFL quarterback and founder of clothing brand JG16
Robert Hass, United States Poet Laureate
Spencer Petras, Quarterback at the University of Iowa
Nick Rolovich, former head football coach at University of Hawaii and Washington State University.

Notes and references

External links
Marin Catholic High School homepage

Roman Catholic Archdiocese of San Francisco
Catholic secondary schools in California
High schools in Marin County, California
Educational institutions established in 1950
1950 establishments in California